Arthur Tenney Emerson (1893–1975) was the governor of American Samoa, serving from April 22 to July 17, 1931.

Emerson was born on December 3, 1893, in East Weymouth, Massachusetts, the son of Theodore and Nellie (née Newman) Emerson. He attended Dartmouth College before being appointed to the United States Naval Academy, graduating with the Class of 1916. He married Gertrude Boucher Childs, the widow of Lieutenant Earle W. F. Childs, in 1921 aboard  in Naples, Italy.

Emerson served in World War I, before receiving appointment to the governorship for a brief time.

References

1893 births
1975 deaths
Governors of American Samoa
American military personnel of World War I
Dartmouth College alumni
United States Naval Academy alumni
People from Weymouth, Massachusetts
Military personnel from Massachusetts